Nicole, Erica, and Jaclyn Dahm, commonly known as  Dahm triplets (born in that order on December 12, 1977) are identical triplets from Minnesota. The Dahm triplets have appeared on many TV shows and movies and have been in magazines such as Teen and  Playboy. They are best known as being only the second set of triplets to be featured in the US edition of Playboy; the first was a set of Brazilian triplets who were featured in November of 1993.

Early lives 
The triplets grew up in Jordan, Minnesota, and attended Jordan's public schools. Originally intending to become nurses, they enrolled at the University of Minnesota after high school.

Career

Playboy career 
They are the Playmates centerfold for the Girls of the Big Ten December 1998 issue of Playboy magazine. According to their Playboy interview, Nicole and Erica have tiny black ink dots (one and two dots, respectively and Jaclyn has no mark) tattooed onto their buttocks, which their parents used to distinguish the three girls when they were babies. They tried out for Playboy'''s "Girls of the Big Ten" issue on the suggestion of their father.

They are the second set of triplets to be featured in the United States edition of Playboy, after "The Trio from Rio, The Amazing Brazilian Triplets" who were featured in the November 1993 issue. The Dahm sisters were featured in several issues of Playboy, but appeared on only one cover, that of Playboy Australia for June 1999.

 Television career 
The trio appeared on the show Boy Meets World in 1999. The trio was also on the Fox reality show Renovate My Family, where Jay McGraw was the host. All three appeared on Family Feud with their older sister Lisa, and father Bob. Along with their father and an assigned interior decorator, they also competed in and won the reality competition show House Wars; their prize for winning was to keep the house which they had renovated.

The triplets more recently appeared as regular members of the mob on the final weeks of NBC's game show 1 vs. 100. The triplets played as one mob member.

The triplets have appeared on episodes of The Doctors, where Jay McGraw is a producer, discussing a variety of topics, principally around their pregnancies, which all happened about the same time. 

 Internet career 

The triplets had their own website, www.dahmgirls.com, which was active until late 2004. The members' area of the site featured photo galleries similar to those produced by Playboy. Toward the end of 2004, that site was replaced with www.jenx3.com (j, e, and n being their initials), which remained active only briefly and contained no nude pictorials. Both sites are no longer online. Other appearances on the internet include a pictorial in the Playboy Cyber Club's celebrity photographer feature, shot by NASCAR racer Dale Earnhardt Jr.

The Dahm Triplets started their own cooking website called "Triplets Gourmet", which is no longer functioning. In addition, the triplets have opened up an account on YouTube also called "TripletsGourmet." Their first video is their collection of recipes and the usefulness of freezing gourmet food. Only one video was made and posted, in 2008.

 Personal lives 
Nicole married Michael Kelly. She gave birth to a daughter on January 14, 2010, and a son on December 7, 2012.

Erica married Jay McGraw, son of Dr. Phil McGraw from Dr. Phil.  She gave birth to a daughter on March 18, 2010, and a son on August 31, 2011.

Jaclyn married Billy Dolan. She gave birth to a daughter on February 3, 2010, and a son on November 3, 2013.

 Filmography Playboy's Video CenterfoldPlayboy's Playmates on the CatwalkJuwanna MannPauly Shore is DeadNudity RequiredRelic HunterBattle DomeBoy Meets World''

References

External links 

1977 births
Living people
1990s Playboy Playmates
People from Minneapolis
Triplets
University of Minnesota School of Nursing alumni
People from Jordan, Minnesota
Sisters